Oberndorf bei Schwanenstadt is a municipality in the district of Vöcklabruck in the Austrian state of Upper Austria.

Population

References

Cities and towns in Vöcklabruck District